Conus scalaris, common name the ladder cone, is a species of sea snail, a marine gastropod mollusk in the family Conidae, the c

one sna

ils and their allies.

Like all species within the genus Conus, these marine snails are predatory and venomous. They are capable of "stinging" humans, therefore live ones should be handled carefully or not at all.

Description
The size of the shell varies between 23 mm and 80 mm. The elevated spire is gradate and maculated with chestnut. The body whorl is somewhat acuminate below The shell is yellowish white with brown-chestnut longitudinal striations, scarcely interrupted for a narrow central white band, and replaced towards the base by a few revolving rows of chestnut markings.

Distribution
This marine species occurs in the Pacific Ocean off Baja California to Costa Rica

References

 Schwengel, J. S. 1955. Nautilus. 69 (1): 15, plate 2, figure 14–15.
 Tucker J.K. & Tenorio M.J. (2009) Systematic classification of Recent and fossil conoidean gastropods. Hackenheim: Conchbooks. 296 pp.
  Puillandre N., Duda T.F., Meyer C., Olivera B.M. & Bouchet P. (2015). One, four or 100 genera? A new classification of the cone snails. Journal of Molluscan Studies. 81: 1–23

External links
 The Conus Biodiversity website
 Cone Shells – Knights of the Sea
 

scalaris
Gastropods described in 1832